Xanthika or Xandika was an ancient Macedonian annual festival, shortly before the vernal equinox, in the month Xanthikos, containing a spring purification march of the army between the two halves of a sacrificed dog, which is associated with the assimilation of the new year's ephebes into the army. According to a fragment of Polybius 23.10 they make offerings to Xanthus as a hero, and perform a purification of the army with horses fully equipped. There was also a Spartan military festival of youths who sacrificed a dog to Enyalius.

References

Sources
Polybius, Rome, and the Hellenistic world By Frank William Walbank Page 80  
Macedonian Institutions Under the Kings by Miltiades Chatzopoulos pages 276,319 

Festivals in ancient Macedonia
Ancient Macedonian army
Greek animal sacrifice
Observances on non-Gregorian calendars
March observances